1294 Antwerpia is a dark background asteroid from the central regions of the asteroid belt. It was discovered on 24 October 1933, by astronomer Eugène Delporte at the Royal Observatory of Belgium in Uccle. It was named for the Belgian city of Antwerp.

Orbit and classification 

Antwerpia is a non-family asteroid of the main belt's background population when applying the hierarchical clustering method to its proper orbital elements. It orbits the Sun in the central main belt at a distance of 2.1–3.3 AU once every 4 years and 5 months (1,608 days).

Naming 

This minor planet was named after the city of Antwerp in Flanders, the Dutch-speaking part of Belgium. The official naming citation was mentioned in The Names of the Minor Planets by Paul Herget in 1955.

Physical characteristics 

In the SMASS classification, Antwerpia is a carbonaceous C-type asteroid. It is also a C-type in both the Tholen- and SMASS-like taxonomy of the Small Solar System Objects Spectroscopic Survey (S3OS2).

Rotation period and poles 

Several rotational lightcurves of Antwerpia have been obtained from photometric observations since 2005. Lightcurve analysis gave a rotation period of 6.63 hours with a brightness variation of 0.42 magnitude.

A 2016-published lightcurve, using modeled photometric data from the Lowell Photometric Database (LPD), gave a concurring period of 6.62521 hours, as well as two spin axis of (128.0°, −66.0°) and (246.0°, −76.0°) in ecliptic coordinates (λ, β).

Diameter and albedo 

According to the surveys carried out by the Infrared Astronomical Satellite IRAS, the Japanese Akari satellite and the NEOWISE mission of NASA's Wide-field Infrared Survey Explorer, Antwerpia measures between 27.82 and 40.717 kilometers in diameter and its surface has an albedo between 0.0887 and 0.125. The Collaborative Asteroid Lightcurve Link derives an albedo of 0.0783 and a diameter of 34.40 kilometers based on an absolute magnitude of 10.7.

Notes

References

External links 
 Lightcurve Database Query (LCDB), at www.minorplanet.info
 Dictionary of Minor Planet Names, Google books
 Asteroids and comets rotation curves, CdR – Geneva Observatory, Raoul Behrend
 Discovery Circumstances: Numbered Minor Planets (1)-(5000) – Minor Planet Center
 
 

001294
Discoveries by Eugène Joseph Delporte
Named minor planets
1294 Antwerpia
001294
19331024